The 2000 edition of the Campeonato Carioca kicked off on January 29, 2000 and ended on June 17, 2000. It is the official tournament organized by FFERJ (Federação de Futebol do Estado do Rio de Janeiro, or Rio de Janeiro State Football Federation. Only clubs based in the Rio de Janeiro State are allowed to play. Fourteen teams contested this edition. Flamengo won the title for the 26th time. Serrano and Itaperuna were relegated.

System
The tournament was divided in four stages:
 Preliminary tournament: All the teams of the championship outside of the big four were divided into two regionalized groups of five teams: one with the teams from Rio de Janeiro plus Itaperuna, and the other with the other hinterland teams; each team played against the teams of its own group in a double round-robin format, and the best four teams would qualify to the main tournament, while the bottom team in each group would be relegated. Each team also received a number of pre-season bonus points and post-season bonus points.
 Taça Guanabara: The 12 clubs all played in single round-robin format against each other, with the two bottom teams being eliminated from the championship.
 Taça Rio: The ten remaining clubs all played in single round-robin format against each other. 
 Finals:  The Finals would happen in two matches, both played at the Maracanã Stadium, between the champions of the Taças Guanabara and Rio.

Championship

Preliminary phase

Group A

Group B

Taça Guanabara

Taça Rio

Finals

References

Campeonato Carioca seasons
Carioca